The Burgess reagent (methyl N-(triethylammoniumsulfonyl)carbamate) is a mild and selective dehydrating reagent often used in organic chemistry.  It was developed in the laboratory of Edward M. Burgess at Georgia Tech.

The Burgess reagent is used to convert secondary and tertiary alcohols with an adjacent proton into alkenes. Dehydration of primary alcohols does not work well. The reagent is soluble in common organic solvents and alcohol dehydration takes place with syn elimination through an intramolecular elimination reaction. The Burgess reagent is a carbamate and an inner salt. A general mechanism is shown below.

Preparation
The reagent is prepared from chlorosulfonylisocyanate by reaction with  methanol and triethylamine in benzene:

References 

Reagents for organic chemistry
Quaternary ammonium compounds
Carbamates
Zwitterions
Dehydrating agents